The Northrop Grumman  AN/APG-83 Scalable Agile Beam Radar (SABR) is a full-performance fire control radar for the General Dynamics F-16 Fighting Falcon and other aircraft. SABR is a multi-function active electronically scanned array (AESA) radar. In a 2013 competition, Lockheed Martin selected SABR as the AESA radar for the F-16 modernization and update programs of the United States Air Force and Republic of China (Taiwan) Air Force.

The capabilities of this advanced AESA are derived from the F-22's APG-77 and the F-35's APG-81. It is designed to fit F-16 aircraft with no structural, power or cooling modifications, the SABR is scalable to fit other aircraft platforms and mission areas.

In 2010, SABR was installed on a USAF F-16 at Edwards AFB and flew 17 consecutive demonstrations sorties without cooling or stability issues

In addition to equipping F-16V for Taiwan and other US allies, US Air Force also selected APG-83 SABR to upgrade 72 of its Air National Guard F-16s.

In January 2014, Singapore ordered 70 AN/APG-83 SABR for its 60 F-16C/D/G+ Block 52 upgrade, in a $2.43 billion deal.

At August 2018, Northrop Grumman had APG-83 fit-in test on F-18

A derivative of the AN/APG-83 SABR, SABR-GS (Global Strike) will be retrofitted to airworthy Rockwell B-1 Lancer airframes beginning in 2016.

In February 2019, Northrop Grumman offered SABR for retrofitting Boeing B-52H Stratofortress, which currently uses mechanically scanning AN/APQ-166 attack radar. In July 2019, Boeing selected AN/APG-82 (AN/APG-79) from Raytheon for its B-52H radar modernization program.

Northrop Grumman to offer SABR radar for Seoul's FA-50 Block 20 fighter

The US Air Force is installing the AN/APG-83 SABR on 608 of its F-16C/D Block 40/42 and F-16C/D 50/52 fighters.

References

External links
 Northrop Grumman SABR Radar
 F-16 Radar Retrofit Program In Development – Aviation Week
 SABR/Scalable Agile Beam Radar – Deagel.com 

Aircraft radars
Northrop Grumman radars
Military electronics of the United States